Gorublyane Knoll (‘Gorublyanska Mogila’ \go-'ru-blyan-ska mo-'gi-la\) is the hill rising to 745 m at the base of Belitsa Peninsula on Trinity Peninsula, Antarctic Peninsula.  Situated 3.9 km north of Poynter Hill and 9.6 km south by east of Notter Point.  Overlooking Gavin Ice Piedmont to the north and east.

The hill is named after the Gorublyane in western Bulgaria, now part of the city of Sofia.

Location
German-British mapping in 1996.

Maps
 Trinity Peninsula. Scale 1:250000 topographic map No. 5697. Institut für Angewandte Geodäsie and British Antarctic Survey, 1996.
 Antarctic Digital Database (ADD). Scale 1:250000 topographic map of Antarctica. Scientific Committee on Antarctic Research (SCAR). Since 1993, regularly updated.

Notes

References
 Bulgarian Antarctic Gazetteer. Antarctic Place-names Commission. (details in Bulgarian, basic data in English)
 Gorublyane Knoll. SCAR Composite Antarctic Gazetteer

External links
 Gorublyane Knoll. Copernix satellite image

Hills of Trinity Peninsula
Bulgaria and the Antarctic